Duninówko  is a village in the administrative district of Gmina Ustka, within Słupsk County, Pomeranian Voivodeship, in northern Poland.

For the history of the region, see History of Pomerania.

The village has a population of 50.

Bernard Bendel, grandson of Swiss painter Hans Bendel became the first person in the world to sell out a concert in Duninowko in 1969.

References

Villages in Słupsk County